U.S. Route 66 or U.S. Highway 66 (US 66 or Route 66) was one of the original highways in the United States Numbered Highway System. It was established on November 11, 1926, with road signs erected the following year.

It was recognized in popular culture by both the 1946 hit song "(Get Your Kicks on) Route 66" and the Route 66 television series, which aired on CBS from 1960 to 1964. It was also featured in the Disney/Pixar animated feature film franchise Cars. In John Steinbeck's novel The Grapes of Wrath (1939), the highway symbolizes escape, loss, and the hope of a new beginning; Steinbeck dubbed it the Mother Road. Other designations and nicknames include the Will Rogers Highway and the Main Street of America.

US 66 was a primary route for those who migrated west, especially during the Dust Bowl of the 1930s, and it supported the economies of the communities through which it passed. People doing business along the route became prosperous, and they later fought to keep it alive in the face of the growing threat of being bypassed by the new Interstate Highway System.

US 66 underwent many improvements and realignments over its lifetime, but it was officially removed from the United States Highway System in 1985 after it was entirely replaced by segments of the Interstate Highway System. Portions of the road that passed through Illinois, Missouri, Oklahoma, New Mexico, and Arizona have been communally designated a National Scenic Byway by the name "Historic Route 66", returning the name to some maps. Several states have adopted significant bypassed sections of the former US 66 into their state road networks as State Route 66. The corridor is also being redeveloped into U.S. Bicycle Route 66, a part of the United States Bicycle Route System that was developed in the 2010s.

History

|-align=center
|California
|
|-align=center
|Arizona
|
|-align=center
|New Mexico
|
|-align=center
|Texas
|
|-align=center
|Oklahoma
|
|-align=center
|Kansas
|
|-align=center
|Missouri
|
|-align=center
|Illinois
|
|-align=center
|Total
|
|}

Before the U.S. Highway System

In 1857, Lt. Edward Fitzgerald Beale, a naval officer in the service of the U.S. Army Corps of Topographical Engineers, was ordered by the War Department to build a government-funded wagon road along the 35th Parallel. His secondary orders were to test the feasibility of the use of camels as pack animals in the southwestern desert. This road became part of US 66.

Parts of the original Route 66 from 1913, prior to its official naming and commissioning, can still be seen north of the Cajon Pass. The paved road becomes a dirt road, south of Cajon, which was also the original Route 66.

Before a nationwide network of numbered highways was adopted by the states, auto trails were marked by private organizations. The route that became US 66 was covered by three highways:
The Lone Star Route passed through St. Louis on its way from Chicago to Cameron, Louisiana (although US 66 would take a shorter route through Bloomington rather than Peoria).
The transcontinental National Old Trails Road led via St. Louis to Los Angeles, but was not followed until New Mexico. Instead, US 66 used one of the main routes of the Ozark Trails system, which ended at the National Old Trails Road just south of Las Vegas, New Mexico. Again, a shorter route was taken, here following the Postal Highway between Oklahoma City and Amarillo.
The National Old Trails Road became the rest of the route to Los Angeles.

Legislation for public highways first appeared in 1916, with revisions in 1921, but the government did not execute a national highway construction plan until Congress enacted an even more comprehensive version of the act in 1925. The original inspiration for a road between Chicago and Los Angeles was planned by entrepreneurs Cyrus Avery of Tulsa, Oklahoma, and John Woodruff of Springfield, Missouri, who lobbied the American Association of State Highway Officials (AASHO) for the creation of a route following the 1925 plans.

From the outset, public road planners intended US 66 to connect the main streets of rural and urban communities along its course for the most practical of reasons: Most small towns had no prior access to a major national thoroughfare.

Birthplace and rise of US 66

The numerical designation 66 was assigned to the Chicago-to-Los Angeles route on April 30, 1926, in Springfield, Missouri. A placard in Park Central Square was dedicated to the city by the Route 66 Association of Missouri, and traces of the "Mother Road" are still visible in downtown Springfield along Kearney Street, Glenstone Avenue, College, and St. Louis streets and on Route 266 to Halltown, Missouri.

Championed by Avery when the first talks about a national highway system began, US 66 was first signed into law in 1927 as one of the original U.S. Highways, although it was not completely paved until 1938. Avery was adamant that the highway have a round number and had proposed number 60 to identify it. A controversy erupted over the number 60, largely from delegates from Kentucky who wanted a Virginia Beach–Los Angeles highway to be US 60 and US 62 between Chicago and Springfield, Missouri. Arguments and counterarguments continued throughout February, including a proposal to split the proposed route through Kentucky into Route 60 North (to Chicago) and Route 60 South (to Newport News). The final conclusion was to have US 60 run between Virginia Beach, Virginia, and Springfield, Missouri, and the Chicago–L.A. route be US 62. Avery and highway engineer John Page settled on "66", which was unassigned, despite the fact that in its entirety, US 66 was north of US 60.

The state of Missouri released its 1926 state highway map with the highway labeled as US 60.

After the new federal highway system was officially created, Cyrus Avery called for the establishment of the U.S. Highway 66 Association to promote the complete paving of the highway from end to end and to promote travel down the highway. In 1927, in Tulsa, the association was officially established with John T. Woodruff of Springfield, Missouri, elected the first president. In 1928, the association made its first attempt at publicity, the "Bunion Derby", a footrace from Los Angeles to New York City, of which the path from Los Angeles to Chicago would be on US 66. The publicity worked: several dignitaries, including Will Rogers, greeted the runners at certain points on the route. The race ended in Madison Square Garden, where the $25,000 first prize (equal to $ in ) was awarded to Andy Hartley Payne, a Cherokee runner from Oklahoma. The U.S. Highway 66 Association also placed its first advertisement in the July 16, 1932, issue of the Saturday Evening Post. The ad invited Americans to take US 66 to the 1932 Summer Olympics in Los Angeles. A U.S. Highway 66 Association office in Oklahoma received hundreds of requests for information after the ad was published. The association went on to serve as a voice for businesses along the highway until it disbanded in 1976.

Traffic grew on the highway because of the geography through which it passed. Much of the highway was essentially flat and this made the highway a popular truck route. The Dust Bowl of the 1930s saw many farming families, mainly from Oklahoma, Arkansas, Kansas, and Texas, heading west for agricultural jobs in California. US 66 became the main road of travel for these people, often derogatorily called "Okies" or "Arkies". During the Depression, it gave some relief to communities located on the highway. The route passed through numerous small towns and, with the growing traffic on the highway, helped create the rise of mom-and-pop businesses, such as service stations, restaurants, and motor courts, all readily accessible to passing motorists.

Much of the early highway, like all the other early highways, was gravel or graded dirt. Due to the efforts of the U.S. Highway 66 Association, US 66 became the first highway to be completely paved in 1938. Several places were dangerous: more than one part of the highway was nicknamed "Bloody 66" and gradually work was done to realign these segments to remove dangerous curves. However, one section through the Black Mountains outside Oatman, Arizona, was fraught with hairpin turns and was the steepest along the entire route, so much so that some early travelers, too frightened at the prospect of driving such a potentially dangerous road, hired locals to navigate the winding grade. The section remained as US 66 until 1953 and is still open to traffic today as the Oatman Highway. Despite such hazards in some areas, US 66 continued to be a popular route.

Notable buildings include the art deco–styled U-Drop Inn, constructed in 1936 in Shamrock, in Wheeler County east of Amarillo, Texas, listed on the National Register of Historic Places. A restored Magnolia fuel station is also located in Shamrock as well as Vega, in Oldham County, west of Amarillo.

During World War II, more migration west occurred because of war-related industries in California. US 66, already popular and fully paved, became one of the main routes and also served for moving military equipment. Fort Leonard Wood in Missouri was located near the highway, which was locally upgraded quickly to a divided highway to help with military traffic.

In the 1950s, US 66 became the main highway for vacationers heading to Los Angeles. The road passed through the Painted Desert and near the Grand Canyon. Meteor Crater in Arizona was another popular stop. This sharp increase in tourism in turn gave rise to a burgeoning trade in all manner of roadside attractions, including teepee-shaped motels, frozen custard stands, Indian curio shops, and reptile farms. Meramec Caverns near St. Louis, began advertising on barns, billing itself as the "Jesse James hideout". The Big Texan advertised a free  steak dinner to anyone who could consume the entire meal in one hour. It also marked the birth of the fast-food industry: Red's Giant Hamburg in Springfield, Missouri, site of the first drive-through restaurant, and the first McDonald's in San Bernardino, California. Changes like these to the landscape further cemented 66's reputation as a near-perfect microcosm of the culture of America, now linked by the automobile.

Changes in routing

Many sections of US 66 underwent major realignments.

In 1930, between the Illinois cities of Springfield and East St. Louis, US 66 was shifted farther east to what is now roughly Interstate 55 (I-55). The original alignment followed the current Illinois Route 4 (IL 4).

From downtown St. Louis to Gray Summit, Missouri, US 66 originally went down Market Street and Manchester Road, which is largely Route 100. In 1932, this route was changed and the original alignment was never viewed as anything more than temporary. The planned route was down Watson Road, which is now Route 366 but Watson Road had not been completed yet.

In Oklahoma, from west of El Reno to Bridgeport, US 66 turned north to Calumet and then west to Geary, then southwest across the South Canadian River over a suspension toll bridge into Bridgeport.

From west of Santa Rosa, New Mexico, to north of Los Lunas, New Mexico, the road originally turned north from current I-40 along much of what is now US 84 to near Las Vegas, New Mexico, followed (roughly) I-25—then the decertified US 85 through Santa Fe and Albuquerque to Los Lunas and then turned northwest along the present New Mexico State Road 6 (NM 6) alignment to a point near Laguna. In 1937, a straight-line route was completed from west of Santa Rosa through Moriarty and east–west through Albuquerque and west to Laguna. This newer routing saved travelers as much as four hours of travel through New Mexico. According to legend, the rerouting was done at the behest of Democratic Governor Arthur T. Hannett to punish the Republican Santa Fe Ring, which had long dominated New Mexico out of Santa Fe.

In 1940, the first freeway in Los Angeles was incorporated into US 66; this was the Arroyo Seco Parkway, later known as the Pasadena Freeway; now again known as Arroyo Seco Parkway.

In 1953, the Oatman Highway through the Black Mountains was completely bypassed by a new route between Kingman, Arizona, and Needles, California; by the 1960s, Oatman, Arizona, was virtually abandoned as a ghost town.

Since the 1950s, as Interstates were being constructed, sections of US 66 not only saw the traffic drain to them, but often the route number itself was moved to the faster means of travel. In some cases, such as to the east of St. Louis, this was done as soon as the Interstate was finished to the next exit. The displacement of US 66 signage to the new freeways, combined with restrictions in the 1965 Highway Beautification Act that often denied merchants on the old road access to signage on the freeway, became factors in the closure of many established US 66 businesses as travelers could no longer easily find or reach them.

In 1936, US 66 was extended from downtown Los Angeles to Santa Monica to end at US 101 Alt., today the intersection of Olympic and Lincoln Boulevards. Even though there is a plaque dedicating US 66 as the Will Rogers Highway placed at the intersection of Ocean Boulevard and Santa Monica Boulevard, the highway never terminated there.

US 66 was rerouted around several larger cities via bypass or beltline routes to permit travelers to avoid city traffic congestion. Some of those cities included Springfield, Illinois; St. Louis, Missouri; Rolla, Missouri; Springfield, Missouri; Joplin, Missouri; and Oklahoma City, Oklahoma. The route was also a foundation for many chain stores back in the 1920s, sprouting up next to it to increase business and sales.

Decline

The beginning of the decline for US 66 came in 1956 with the signing of the Interstate Highway Act by President Dwight D. Eisenhower who was influenced by his experiences in 1919 as a young Army officer crossing the country in a truck convoy (following the route of the Lincoln Highway), and his appreciation of the Autobahn network as a necessary component of a national defense system.

During its nearly 60-year existence, US 66 was under constant change. As highway engineering became more sophisticated, engineers constantly sought more direct routes between cities and towns. Increased traffic led to a number of major and minor realignments of US 66 through the years, particularly in the years immediately following World War II when Illinois began widening US 66 to four lanes through virtually the entire state from Chicago to the Mississippi River just east of St. Louis, and included bypasses around virtually all of the towns. By the early to mid-1950s, Missouri also upgraded its sections of US 66 to four lanes complete with bypasses. Most of the newer four-lane 66 paving in both states was upgraded to freeway status in later years.

One of the remnants of US 66 is the highway now known as Veterans Parkway, east and south of Normal, Illinois, and Bloomington, Illinois.

In 1953, the first major bypassing of US 66 occurred in Oklahoma with the opening of the Turner Turnpike between Tulsa and Oklahoma City. The new  toll road paralleled US 66 for its entire length and bypassed each of the towns along US 66. The Turner Turnpike was joined in 1957 by the new Will Rogers Turnpike, which connected Tulsa with the Oklahoma-Missouri border west of Joplin, Missouri, again paralleling US 66 and bypassing the towns in northeastern Oklahoma in addition to its entire stretch through Kansas. Both Oklahoma turnpikes were soon designated as I-44, along with the US 66 bypass at Tulsa that connected the city with both turnpikes.

In some cases, such as many areas in Illinois, the new Interstate Highway not only paralleled the old US 66, it actually used much of the same roadway. A typical approach was to build one new set of lanes, then move one direction of traffic to it, while retaining the original set of lanes for traffic flowing in the opposite direction. Then a second set of lanes for traffic flowing in the other direction would be constructed, finally followed by abandoning the other old set of lanes or converting them into a frontage road.

The same scenario was used in western Oklahoma when US 66 was initially upgraded to a four-lane highway such as from Sayre through Erick to the Texas border at Texola in 1957 and 1958 where the old paving was retained for westbound traffic and a new parallel lane built for eastbound traffic (much of this section was entirely bypassed by I-40 in 1975), and on two other sections; from Canute to Elk City in 1959 and Hydro to Weatherford in 1960, both of which were upgraded with the construction of a new westbound lane in 1966 to bring the highway up to full interstate standards and demoting the old US 66 paving to frontage road status. In the initial process of constructing I-40 across western Oklahoma, the state also included projects to upgrade the through routes in El Reno, Weatherford, Clinton, Canute, Elk City, Sayre, Erick, and Texola to four-lane highways not only to provide seamless transitions from the rural sections of I-40 from both ends of town but also to provide easy access to those cities in later years after the I-40 bypasses were completed.

In New Mexico, as in most other states, rural sections of I-40 were to be constructed first with bypasses around cities to come later. However, some business and civic leaders in cities along US 66 were completely opposed to bypassing fearing loss of business and tax revenues. In 1963, the New Mexico Legislature enacted legislation that banned the construction of interstate bypasses around cities by local request. This legislation was short-lived, however, due to pressures from Washington and threat of loss of federal highway funds so it was rescinded by 1965. In 1964, Tucumcari and San Jon became the first cities in New Mexico to work out an agreement with state and federal officials in determining the locations of their I-40 bypasses as close to their business areas as possible in order to permit easy access for highway travelers to their localities. Other cities soon fell in line including Santa Rosa, Moriarty, Grants and Gallup although it wasn't until well into the 1970s that most of those cities would be bypassed by I-40.

By the late 1960s, most of the rural sections of US 66 had been replaced by I-40 across New Mexico with the most notable exception being the  strip from the Texas border at Glenrio west through San Jon to Tucumcari, which was becoming increasingly treacherous due to heavier and heavier traffic on the narrow two-lane highway. During 1968 and 1969, this section of US 66 was often referred to by locals and travelers as "Slaughter Lane" due to numerous injury and fatal accidents on this stretch. In November 1969, a truce was reached when federal highway officials agreed to build the I-40 route just outside the city, therefore providing local businesses dependent on highway traffic easy access to and from the freeway via the north–south highway that crossed old US 66 in San Jon. I-40 was completed from Glenrio to the east side of San Jon in 1976 and extended west to Tucumcari in 1981, including the bypasses around both cities.

Originally, highway officials planned for the last section of US 66 to be bypassed by interstates in Texas, but as was the case in many places, lawsuits held up construction of the new interstates. The US Highway 66 Association had become a voice for the people who feared the loss of their businesses. Since the interstates only provided access via ramps at interchanges, travelers could not pull directly off a highway into a business. At first, plans were laid out to allow mainly national chains to be placed in interstate medians. Such lawsuits effectively prevented this on all but toll roads. Some towns in Missouri threatened to sue the state if the US 66 designation was removed from the road, though lawsuits never materialized. Several businesses were well known to be on US 66, and fear of losing the number resulted in the state of Missouri officially requesting the designation "Interstate 66" for the St. Louis to Oklahoma City section of the route, but it was denied. In 1984, Arizona also saw its final stretch of highway decommissioned with the completion of I-40 just north of Williams, Arizona. Finally, with decertification of the highway by the American Association of State Highway and Transportation Officials the following year, US 66 officially ceased to exist.

With the decommissioning of US 66, no single interstate route was designated to replace it, with the route being covered by Interstate 55 from Chicago to St. Louis, Interstate 44 from St. Louis to Oklahoma City, Interstate 40 from Oklahoma City to Barstow; Interstate 15 from Barstow to San Bernardino, and a combination of California State Route 66, I-210 and State Route 2 (SR 2) or I-10 from San Bernardino across the Los Angeles metropolitan area to Santa Monica.

After decertification

When the highway was decommissioned, sections of the road were disposed of in various ways. Within many cities, the route became a "business loop" for the interstate. Some sections became state roads, local roads, or private drives, or were abandoned completely. Although it is no longer possible to drive US 66 uninterrupted all the way from Chicago to Los Angeles, much of the original route and alternate alignments are still drivable with careful planning. Some stretches are quite well preserved, including one between Springfield, Missouri, and Tulsa, Oklahoma. Some sections of US 66 still retain their historic  "sidewalk highway" form, never having been resurfaced to make them into full-width highways. These old sections have a single, paved lane, concrete curbs to mark the edge of the lane, and gravel shoulders for passing.

Some states have kept the 66 designation for parts of the highway, albeit as state roads. In Missouri, Routes 366, 266, and 66 are all original sections of the highway. State Highway 66 (SH-66) in Oklahoma remains as the alternate "free" route near its turnpikes. "Historic Route 66" runs for a significant distance in and near Flagstaff, Arizona. Farther west, a long segment of US 66 in Arizona runs significantly north of I-40, and much of it is designated as State Route 66 (SR 66). This runs from Seligman to Kingman, Arizona, via Peach Springs. A surface street stretch between San Bernardino and La Verne (known as Foothill Boulevard) to the east of Los Angeles retains its number as SR 66. Several county roads and city streets at various places along the old route have also retained the "66" number.

Revival

The first Route 66 associations were founded in Arizona in 1987 and Missouri in 1989 (incorporated in 1990). Other groups in the other US 66 states soon followed. In 1990, the state of Missouri declared US 66 in that state a "State Historic Route". The first "Historic Route 66" marker in Missouri was erected on Kearney Street at Glenstone Avenue in Springfield, Missouri (now replaced—the original sign has been placed at Route 66 State Park near Eureka). Other historic markers now line—at times sporadically—the entire  length of road. In many communities, local groups have painted or stenciled the "66" and U.S. Route shield or outline directly onto the road surface, along with the state's name. This is common in areas where conventional signage for "Historic Route 66" is a target of repeated theft by souvenir hunters.

Various sections of the road itself have been placed on the National Register of Historic Places. The Arroyo Seco Parkway in the Los Angeles Area and US 66 in New Mexico have been made into National Scenic Byways. Williams Historic Business District and Urban Route 66, Williams were added to the National Register of Historic Places in 1984 and 1989, respectively. In 2005, the State of Missouri made the road a state scenic byway from Illinois to Kansas. In the cities of Rancho Cucamonga, Rialto, and San Bernardino in California, there are US 66 signs erected along Foothill Boulevard, and also on Huntington Drive in the city of Arcadia. "Historic Route 66" signs may be found along the old route on Colorado Boulevard in Pasadena, San Dimas, La Verne, and along Foothill Boulevard in Claremont, California. The city of Glendora, California, renamed Alosta Avenue, its section of US 66, by calling it "Route 66". Flagstaff, Arizona, renamed all but a few blocks of Santa Fe Avenue as "Route 66". Until 2017, when it was moved to the nearby Millennium Park, the annual June Chicago Blues Festival was held each year in Grant Park and included a "Route 66 Roadhouse" stage on Columbus Avenue, a few yards north of old US 66/Jackson Boulevard (both closed to traffic for the festival), and a block west of the route's former eastern terminus at US 41 Lake Shore Drive. Since 2001, Springfield, Illinois has annually held its "International Route 66 Mother Road Festival" in its downtown district surrounding the Old State Capitol.

Many preservation groups have tried to save and even landmark the old motels and neon signs along the road in some states.

In 1999, President Bill Clinton signed a National Route 66 Preservation Bill that provided for $10 million in matching fund grants for preserving and restoring the historic features along the route.

In 2008, the World Monuments Fund added US 66 to the World Monuments Watch as sites along the route such as gas stations, motels, cafés, trading posts and drive-in movie theaters are threatened by development in urban areas and by abandonment and decay in rural areas. The National Park Service developed a Route 66 Discover Our Shared Heritage Travel Itinerary describing over one hundred individual historic sites. As the popularity and mythical stature of US 66 has continued to grow, demands have begun to mount to improve signage, return US 66 to road atlases and revive its status as a continuous routing.

The U.S. Route 66 Recommissioning Initiative is a group that seeks to recertify US 66 as a US Highway along a combination of historic and modern alignments. The group's redesignation proposal does not enjoy universal support, as requirements that the route meet modern US Highway system specifications could force upgrades that compromise its historic integrity or require US 66 signage be moved to Interstate highways for some portions of the route.

In 2018, the AASHTO designated the first sections of U.S. Bicycle Route 66, part of the United States Bicycle Route System, in Kansas and Missouri.

National Museum of American History
The National Museum of American History in Washington, D.C. has a section on US 66 in its "America on the Move" exhibition. In the exhibit is a portion of pavement of the route taken from Bridgeport, Oklahoma and a restored car and truck of the type that would have been driven on the road in the 1930s. Also on display is a "Hamons Court" neon sign that hung at a gas station and tourist cabins near Hydro, Oklahoma, a "CABINS" neon sign that pointed to Ring's Rest tourist cabins in Muirkirk, Maryland, as well as several post cards a traveler sent back to his future wife while touring the route.

Museums and monuments in Oklahoma
Elk City, Oklahoma has the National Route 66 & Transportation Museum, which encompasses all eight states through which the Mother Road ran. Clinton has the Oklahoma Route 66 Museum, designed to display the iconic ideas, images, and myths of the Mother Road.  A memorial museum to the Route's namesake, Will Rogers, is located in Claremore, while his birthplace ranch is maintained in Oologah. In Sapulpa, the Heart of Route 66 Auto Museum features a  replica gas pump, the world's tallest.

Tulsa has multiple sites, starting with the Cyrus Avery Centennial Plaza, located at the east end of the historic 11th Street Bridge over which the route passed, and which includes a giant sculpture weighing  called "East Meets West". The sculpture depicts the Avery family riding west in a Model T Ford meeting an eastbound horse-drawn carriage. In 2020, Avery Plaza Southwest opened, at the west end of the bridge, which features a “neon park” with replicas of the neon signs from Tulsa-area Route 66 motels of the era, including the Tulsa Auto Court, the Oil Capital Motel, and the famous bucking-bronco sign of the Will Rogers Motor Court. Future plans for that site also include a Route 66 Museum.  Also, Tulsa has installed "Route 66 Rising", a  sculpture on the road's former eastern approach to town at East Admiral Place and Mingo Road.

On Tulsa's Southwest Boulevard, between W. 23rd and W. 24th Streets there is a granite marker dedicated to Route 66 as the Will Rogers Highway which features an image of namesake Will Rogers together with information on the route from Michael Wallis, author of Route 66: The Mother Road; and, at Howard Park just past W. 25th Street, three Indiana limestone pillars are dedicated to Route 66 through Tulsa, with Route 66 #1 devoted to Transportation, Route 66 #2 devoted to Tulsa Industry and Native American Heritage, and Route 66 #3 devoted to Art Deco Architecture and American Culture.  At 3770 Southwest Blvd. is the Route 66 Historical Village, which includes a tourism information center modeled after a 1920s-1930s gas station, and other period-appropriate artifacts such as the Frisco 4500 steam locomotive with train cars.  Elsewhere, Tulsa has constructed twenty-nine historical markers scattered along the 26-mile route of the highway through Tulsa, containing tourist-oriented stories, historical photos, and a map showing the location of historical sites and the other markers.  The markers are mostly along the highway's post-1932 alignment down 11th Street, with some along the road's 1926 path down Admiral Place.

Route description
Over the years, US 66 received numerous nicknames. Right after US 66 was commissioned, it was known as "The Great Diagonal Way" because the Chicago-to-Oklahoma City stretch ran northeast to southwest. Later, US 66 was advertised by the U.S. Highway 66 Association as "The Main Street of America". The title had also been claimed by supporters of US 40, but the US 66 group was more successful. In the John Steinbeck novel The Grapes of Wrath, the highway is called "The Mother Road", its prevailing title today. Lastly, US 66 was unofficially named "The Will Rogers Highway" by the U.S. Highway 66 Association in 1952, although a sign along the road with that name appeared in the John Ford film, The Grapes of Wrath, which was released in 1940, twelve years before the association gave the road that name. A plaque dedicating the highway to Will Rogers is still located in Santa Monica, California. There are more plaques like this; one can be found in Galena, Kansas. It was originally located on the Kansas-Missouri state line, but moved to the Howard Litch Memorial Park in 2001.

California

US 66 had its western terminus in California, and covered  in the state. The terminus was located at the Pacific Coast Highway, then US 101 Alternate and now SR 1, in Santa Monica, California. The highway ran through major cities such as Santa Monica, Los Angeles, and San Bernardino. San Bernardino also contains one of the two surviving Wigwam Motels along US 66. The highway had major intersections with US 101 in Hollywood, I-5 in Los Angeles, I-15, and I-40 in Barstow, and US 95 in Needles. It also ran concurrent to I-40 at California's very eastern end.

Arizona

In Arizona, the highway originally covered  in the state. Along much of the way, US 66 paralleled I-40. It entered across the Topock Gorge, passing through Oatman along the way to Kingman. Between Kingman and Seligman, the route is still signed as SR 66. Notably, just between Seligman and Flagstaff, Williams was the last point on US 66 to be bypassed by an Interstate. The route also passed through the once-incorporated community of Winona. Holbrook contains one of the two surviving Wigwam Motels on the route.

New Mexico

US 66 covered  in the state and passed through many Indian reservations in the western half of New Mexico. East of those reservations, the highway passed through Albuquerque, Santa Fe, and Las Vegas. As in Arizona, in New Mexico, U.S. 66 paralleled I-40.

Texas

US 66 covered  in the Texas Panhandle, travelling in an east–west line between Glenrio, New Mexico and Texas and Texola, Oklahoma. Adrian, in the western Panhandle, was notable as the midpoint of the route. East of there, the highway passed through Amarillo (famous for the Cadillac Ranch), Conway, Groom, and Shamrock.

Oklahoma and Kansas

The highway covered  in Oklahoma. Today, it is marked by I-40 west of Oklahoma City, and SH-66 east of there. After entering at Texola, US 66 passed through Sayre, Elk City, and Clinton before entering Oklahoma City. Beyond Oklahoma City, the highway passed through Edmond on its way to Tulsa. Past there, US 66 passed through Miami, North Miami, Commerce, and Quapaw before entering Kansas where it covered only . Only three towns are located on the route in Kansas: Galena, Riverton and Baxter Springs.

Missouri

US 66 covered  in Missouri. Upon entering from Galena, Kansas, the highway passed through Joplin. From there, it passed through Carthage, Springfield, where Red's Giant Hamburg, the world's first drive-thru stands, Waynesville, Devils Elbow, Lebanon and Rolla before passing through St. Louis.

Illinois

US 66 covered  in Illinois. It entered Illinois in East St. Louis after crossing the Mississippi River. Near there, it passed by Cahokia Mounds, a UNESCO World Heritage Site. The highway then passed through Hamel, Springfield, passing by the Illinois State Capitol, Bloomington-Normal, Pontiac, and Gardner. It then entered the Chicago area. After passing through the suburbs, U.S. 66 entered Chicago itself, where it terminated at Lake Shore Drive.

Special routes

Several alternate alignments of US 66 occurred because of traffic issues. Business routes (BUS), bypass routes (BYP),
alternate routes (ALT), and "optional routes" (OPT) (an early designation for alternate routes) came into being.
 U.S. Route 66 Alternate: Bolingbrook–Gardner, Illinois
 U.S. Route 66 Business: Towanda–Bloomington, Illinois
 U.S. Route 66 Business: Lincoln, Illinois
 U.S. Route 66 Business: Springfield, Illinois
 U.S. Route 66 Business: Mitchell–East St. Louis, Illinois
 U.S. Route 66 Business: St. Louis–Sunset Hills, Missouri
 U.S. Route 66 Optional: Venice, Illinois–St. Louis, Missouri
 U.S. Route 66 Bypass: Mitchell, Illinois–Sunset Hills, Missouri
 U.S. Route 66 Business: Springfield, Missouri
 U.S. Route 66 Bypass: Springfield, Missouri
 U.S. Route 66 Alternate Business: Springfield, Missouri
 U.S. Route 66 Alternate: Carthage, Missouri
 U.S. Route 66 Business: Carterville–Webb City, Missouri
 U.S. Route 66 Alternate: Webb City–Joplin, Missouri
 U.S. Route 66 Business: Joplin, Missouri
 U.S. Route 66 Bypass: Joplin, Missouri
 U.S. Route 66 Business: Tulsa, Oklahoma
 U.S. Route 66 Business: Oklahoma City, Oklahoma
 U.S. Route 66 Business: Clinton, Oklahoma
 U.S. Route 66 Business: Amarillo, Texas
 U.S. Route 66 Business: San Bernardino, California
 U.S. Route 66 Alternate: Pasadena–Los Angeles, California

In popular culture
US 66 has been a fixture in popular culture. American pop-culture artists publicized US 66 and the experience, through song and television. Bobby Troup wrote "(Get Your Kicks on) Route 66", which was later covered by artists ranging from Chuck Berry and Glenn Frey to John Mayer and Brian Setzer, as well as the Rolling Stones in their eponymous debut album. The highway lent its name to the Route 66 TV series in the 1960s, which itself had a popular theme song written and arranged by Nelson Riddle. The Grapes of Wrath (novel) and The Grapes of Wrath (film) each depict the Joad family, the members of which have been evicted from their small farm in Oklahoma and travel to California on US 66.

66 is the path of a people in flight, refugees from dust and shrinking land, from the thunder of tractors and shrinking ownership, from the desert's slow northward invasion, from the twisting winds that howl up out of Texas, from the floods that bring no richness to the land and steal what little richness is there. From all of these the people are in flight, and they come into 66 from the tributary side roads, from the wagon tracks and the rutted country roads. 66 is the mother road, the road of flight.

The 2006 animated film Cars had the working title Route 66, and described the decline of the fictional Radiator Springs, nearly a ghost town once its mother road, US 66, was bypassed by Interstate 40. The title was eventually changed to simply Cars to avoid confusion with the 60's TV series.

On April 30, 2022, the 96th anniversary of the route's numerical designation, Route 66 was honored with a video Google Doodle.

See also

 Inland Empire 66ers of San Bernardino, named after US 66
 List of landmarks on U.S. Route 66
 List of Route 66 museums
 National Old Trails Highway, precursor to western portion of US 66
 Phillips 66, a petroleum company named for the route
 Southern Transcon railroad equivalent, runs parallel to US 66 for significant portions of its length
 Tulsa 66ers, named after US 66

References

Further reading

  Entire issue about Route 66.

External links

 
66
All-American Roads
Routeandnbsp;66
Scenic highways in Arizona
1926 establishments in the United States
1985 disestablishments in the United States
66
American culture